Børge Lund (born 13 March 1979) is a retired Norwegian handball player and current handball coach of Elverum. He played 216 matches and scored 390 goals for the Norway men's national handball team between 2000 and 2014. He participated at the 2005 and 2007 World Men's Handball Championship, as well in the 2011 World Men's Handball Championship and the 2012 and 2014 European Men's Handball Championship.

References

External links

1979 births
Living people
Norwegian male handball players
Sportspeople from Bodø
Expatriate handball players
Norwegian expatriate sportspeople in Denmark
Norwegian expatriate sportspeople in Germany